Eremobia is a genus of moths of the family Noctuidae.

Species
 Eremobia decipiens (Alphéraky, 1895)
 Eremobia ochroleuca (Denis & Schiffermüller, 1775)
 Eremobia puengeleri (Bartel, 1904)
 Eremobia sajanus (Bang-Haas, 1906)

References
Natural History Museum Lepidoptera genus database
Eremobia at funet

Hadeninae